Nikola Panayot Pavletich is the former chair of structural biology at Memorial Sloan Kettering Cancer Center.

Education
Pavletich received his BS in chemistry from Caltech in 1988 and his PhD in molecular biology and genetics from Johns Hopkins University School of Medicine in 1991. He did a postdoc at MIT with Carl Pabo.

Career
He joined the faculty at Sloan Kettering in 1993 and was named chair of the Structural Biology Program in 2003. He has been an HHMI investigator since 1997.

His laboratory researches malignant cell growth and DNA damage contributing to the development of cancer. DNA damage repair is a significant factor in whether a cell will become cancerous after genetic insult. Some of his major focuses have been the mTOR pathway and BRCA1. His lab uses x-ray crystallography to determine how proteins interact.

Awards 
 1994 – Pew Scholar 
 1995 – Beckman Young Investigators Award
 1999 – MIT Innovators under 35
 2000 – AACR Award for Outstanding Achievement in Cancer Research
 2003 – Paul Marks Prize for Cancer Research
 2012 – Elected member of the National Academy of Sciences
 2014 – Elected fellow of the American Academy of Arts and Sciences
 2015 – Elected member of the Institute of Medicine
 Cornelius P. Rhoads Memorial Award, American Association for Cancer Research
 DuPont-Merck Young Investigator Award, The Protein Society

References 

Cancer researchers
Living people
Fellows of the American Academy of Arts and Sciences
Members of the United States National Academy of Sciences
Members of the National Academy of Medicine
Year of birth missing (living people)